The 2002 Japanese Formula 3 Championship was the 24th edition of the Japanese Formula 3 Championship. It began on 2 March at Tsukuba and ended on 20 October at Motegi. Local driver Takashi Kogure took the championship title, winning 11 from 20 races.

Teams and drivers
All teams were Japanese-registered. All cars were powered by Bridgestone tyres.

Race calendar and results

Standings
Points are awarded as follows:

References

External links
Official Site 

Formula Three
Japanese Formula 3 Championship seasons
Japan
Japanese Formula 3